Siah Manseh-ye Bala (also Romanized as Sīāh Manseh-ye Bālā; also known as Seyāh Mūneseh, Sīāh Mūneseh, and Sīāh Mūnseh) is a village in Lat Leyl Rural District, Otaqvar District, Langarud County, Gilan Province, Iran. At the 2006 census, its population was 245, in 64 families.

References 

Populated places in Langarud County